Oryan may refer to:
 Oryan, Lorestan
 Oryan, Sabzevar, Razavi Khorasan Province
 Oryan, Torbat-e Heydarieh, Razavi Khorasan Province